Kyo Maclear (born 1970) is a Canadian novelist and children's author.

Maclear was born in London, England and moved to Toronto, Canada at a young age. Her father is journalist and documentary filmmaker Michael Maclear.

She studied fine art and art history at the University of Toronto and also completed an M.A. in cultural studies at the Ontario Institute for Studies in Education in 1996.

Bibliography

Novels 
 The Letter Opener (Toronto: HarperCollins, 2007) - Finalist, Amazon.ca First Novel Award (2008)

 Stray Love (Toronto: HarperCollins Canada, 2012)

Nonfiction 
 Birds Art Life: A Year of Observation (New York: Scribner, 2017) - Winner, Trillium Book Award (2018)

Children's literature 
 Spork (Toronto: Kids Can Press, 2010. Illustrated by Isabelle Arsenault)
 Virginia Wolf (Toronto: Kids Can Press, 2012. Illustrated by Isabelle Arsenault)
 Mr. Flux (Toronto: Kids Can Press, 2013. Illustrated by Matte Stephens)
 Julia Child (Toronto: Tundra Books, 2014. Illustrated by Julie Morstad)
 The wish tree (San Francisco: Chronicle Books, 2016. Illustrated by Chris Turnham)
Operatic (Toronto: Groundwood Books, 2019. Illustrated by Byron Eggenschwiler)
 It Began with a Page: How Gyo Fujikawa Drew the Way (New York: HarperCollins, 2019. Illustrated by Julie Morstad)

References

External links 
 http://www.kyomaclear.com/
 http://kyomaclearkids.com/

Canadian people of British descent
Canadian people of Japanese descent
Canadian women novelists
Canadian writers of Asian descent
Canadian children's writers
1970 births
Living people
21st-century Canadian novelists
Canadian women children's writers
21st-century Canadian women writers